William Joel Ventenilla Wilson (born January 30, 1980) is a Filipino-American former professional basketball player who is currently an assistant coach for the Phoenix Pulse Fuel Masters of the Philippine Basketball Association (PBA). He played for four teams in the PBA. He spent his college years playing in De La Salle University before being drafted fifteenth overall by the Alaska Aces in the 2004 PBA draft.

On November 3, 2013, Wilson was traded from Barangay Ginebra to the Barako Bull Energy along with Rico Maierhofer for James Forrester.

PBA career statistics

Correct as of September 24, 2016

Season-by-season averages

|-
| align=left | 
| align=left | Alaska
| 43 || 7.5 || .443 || .000 || .600 || 1.5 || .5 || .3 || .0 || 1.5
|-
| align=left | 
| align=left | Alaska
| 36 || 10.6 || .398 || .222 || .889 || 2.0 || .7 || .3 || .0 || 3.0
|-
| align=left | 
| align=left | San Miguel
| 61 || 18.9 || .545 || 1.000 || .841 || 4.7 || 1.0 || .3 || .1 || 5.6
|-
| align=left | 
| align=left | Magnolia / Barangay Ginebra
| 21 || 11.5 || .488 || .000 || .765 || 2.2 || .7 || .3 || .1 || 2.6
|-
| align=left | 
| align=left | Barangay Ginebra
| 39 || 23.0 || .507 || .000 || .679 || 4.9 || 1.0 || .4 || .2 || 4.9
|-
| align=left | 
| align=left | Barangay Ginebra
| 44 || 20.1 || .497 || .000 || .787 || 4.7 || .8 || .3 || .2 || 5.9
|-
| align=left | 
| align=left | Barangay Ginebra
| 52 || 19.2 || .570 || .000 || .784 || 4.4 || 1.2 || .3 || .1 || 2.6
|-
| align=left | 
| align=left | Barangay Ginebra
| 39 || 20.0 || .401 || .000 || .701 || 4.7 || 1.0 || .4 || .2 || 5.0
|-
| align=left | 
| align=left | Barangay Ginebra
| 35 || 15.7 || .456 || .000 || .744 || 3.3 || .6 || .2 || .0 || 3.8
|-
| align=left | 
| align=left | Barako Bull
| 33 || 18.9 || .400 || .100 || .651 || 4.3 || 1.1 || .2 || .0 || 3.6
|-
| align=left | 
| align=left | Barako Bull
| 28 || 21.9 || .508 || .263 || .679 || 3.9 || 1.1 || .5 || .1 || 6.0
|-
| align=left | 
| align=left | Barako Bull / Phoenix
| 34 || 33.0 || .507 || .333 || .773 || 8.9 || 2.5 || .5 || .3 || 11.6
|-class=sortbottom
| align=center colspan=2 | Career
| 465 || 18.4 || .489 || .227 || .756 || 4.2 || 1.0 || .3 || .1 || 5.0

References

1980 births
Living people
Alaska Aces (PBA) players
Barako Bull Energy players
Barangay Ginebra San Miguel players
Filipino men's basketball players
Phoenix Super LPG Fuel Masters players
Power forwards (basketball)
San Miguel Beermen players
Small forwards
De La Salle Green Archers basketball players
Basketball players from Los Angeles
Filipino men's basketball coaches
Phoenix Super LPG Fuel Masters coaches
Alaska Aces (PBA) draft picks
American sportspeople of Filipino descent
Citizens of the Philippines through descent